Roy Sizmore (born 17 November 1950 in Hillingdon, England) is a former motorcycle speedway rider in National League (speedway) and Grasstrack rider.

His career started in 1973 under promoter Danny Dunton at Peterborough and he would ride for a number of clubs over the next four years, filling in when riders were injured as a popular replacement. His most appearances as a Club rider were with Peterborough Panthers 1975 -35 meetings, 121 rides, amassing 115 points and Oxford Cheetahs 1976 – 34 meetings, 111 rides, amassing 137 points

As the 1975 season ended, Harry Bastable and Tony Allsopp, promoters at Stoke, moved the licence to Oxford for 1976, when Oxford Rebels moved to White City Stadium when it was feared the stadium would be demolished. 
The following years were lean times and Roy retired at the end of 1977, only having had 11 rides for four different clubs.
After speedway, Roy raced Grasstrack, becoming South Midland Centre Champion 1990 and third-placed British Best Pairs 1993 with Andy Gomm.

References

External links
 https://wwosbackup.proboards.com/thread/2786 
 https://grasstrackgb.co.uk/roy-sizmore/ 
 https://grasstrackgb.co.uk/roy-sizmore/
 http://www.speedway-forum.co.uk/forums/index.php?/topic/89751-compact-team-performances/
 https://www.speedwayresearcher.org.uk/coventry21973.pdf
 http://peterborough-speedway.com/stats70_79
 https://www.youtube.com/watch?v=xJTWDXJTcqY
 https://www.pressreader.com/uk/the-peterborough-evening-telegraph/20140130/283197261209482
 http://www.defunctspeedway.co.uk/oxford.htm
 https://dokumen.tips/documents/season-1975-speedway-gb-roy-carter-3-2-3-1-3-12-1-6-roy-sizmore-1-2-ts-3-0-7.html?page=1
 http://www.historyspeedway.nstrefa.pl/zawodnicy.php?kraj=Anglia%20(England)&limit=1400

1950 births
English motorcycle racers
British speedway riders
Oxford Cheetahs riders
Peterborough Panthers riders
Coventry Bees riders
Reading Racers riders
Stoke Potters riders
Living people